Frederik Fetterlein (born 11 July 1970) is a retired tennis player from Denmark, who turned professional in 1989.

Tennis career
The right-hander Fetterlein represented his native country at the 1996 Summer Olympics in Atlanta, Georgia, where he was defeated in the second round by Switzerland's Marc Rosset. Fetterlein reached his career-high ATP singles ranking of World No. 75 in October 1995. During his career, he defeated Thomas Muster and Stefan Edberg, amongst other top players.

ATP Challengers and ITF Futures titles

Singles: 4

See also
List of Denmark Davis Cup team representatives

References

External links
 
 
 
 

1970 births
Living people
Danish male tennis players
Olympic tennis players of Denmark
People from Glostrup Municipality
Tennis players at the 1992 Summer Olympics
Tennis players at the 1996 Summer Olympics
Sportspeople from the Capital Region of Denmark